The 2018 Slough Borough Council election took place on 3 May 2018 to elect members of Slough Borough Council in England. This was on the same day as other local elections.

Results

Ward results

Baylis and Stoke

Britwell and Northborough

Central

Chalvey

Cippenham Green

Cippenham Meadows

Colnbrook with Poyle

Elliman

Farnham

Haymill and Lynch Hill

Langley Kedermister

Langley St Mary's

Upton

Wexham Lea

References 

2018
2018 English local elections